Zenga TV is India's largest OTT player and digital video company, a brand of Zenga Media Pte Ltd. Zenga received the rights to telecast the 2012 tour of the Indian cricket team in Sri Lanka.

References 

Mass media companies established in 2009
Indian companies established in 2009
Digital broadcasting